Badhan may refer to:

 Badhan, Sanaag, a town in Somalia
 al-Badhan, a Palestinian village in the West Bank
 Badhan (organization), a blood donation organization in Bangladesh
 Badhan (Persian Governor), governor of Yemen during the time of the Prophet Mohammed
 An alternative spelling for  badchen, a type of Jewish entertainer

See also

Badham